UST, formerly known as UST GLOBAL, is a provider of digital technology and transformation, information technology and services, headquartered in Aliso Viejo, California, United States. Stephen Ross founded UST in 1998 in Laguna Hills. The company has offices in the Americas, EMEA, APAC, and India.

In June 2018, Temasek, Singapore’s sovereign wealth fund, invested  million in UST, giving UST a  billion-plus valuation.

Services

UST offers services in areas like digital transformation, cybersecurity, data analytics, data engineering, technology and digital consulting, supply chain management, cloud infrastructure, developer productivity, quality engineering, IT talent sourcing, innovation as a service, legacy modernization, human-centered design, AMS, semiconductor engineering, IOT engineering, intelligent process automation, artificial intelligence, machine learning, and technology strategy, intelligent automation and BPaaS. Examples of specific services include:

Cloud 
In 2020, UST released UST CloudDesk and UST MultiCloud Manager. UST CloudDesk enables enterprises to move workloads between different cloud platforms. UST MultiCloud Manager, an IT-as-a-service platform, allows its users to have a zero-touch, single-pane view of their entire IT environment.

Digital Transformation 
In 2020, UST announced a mobile-based international transactions application blockchain for a Spanish multinational commercial bank and financial services company. The application allows end customers to complete international transactions in minutes vs. the original four to five working days.

DevOps 
UST offers development and operational services such as data management, analysis, and automation for DevSecOps, and digital and cloud transformation. This includes its product, PACE, used for implementing and optimizing cloud-native DevOps.

In July 2020, UST invested in Smart Software Testing Solutions (SSTS) Inc. to incorporate intelligent testing and digital validation for its Software Validation and Test Automation. SSTS’s platforms allow testers to perform manual and automation testing on more than 5000 device-browser combinations.

Cybersecurity 
In July 2020, UST’s company CyberProof became an official member of the Microsoft Intelligent Security Association. CyberProof monitors security alerts and suspicious events collected from internal and external customer data sources and detects threats in cloud and on-premises infrastructure threats.

Innovation 
UST has employees in countries including the United States, United Kingdom, India, and Malaysia. The first Malaysian Lab opened in January 2020. Through the Labs, UST employees are exposed to new technologies and receive access to top R&D institutions and disruptive startups from around the world.

Recognitions

Innovation
The company has three "engines of innovation". "Infinity Labs" is a network of "innovation gyms" where professionals are invited to experiment without fear of mistakes, 'Innovation Hub' is UST's Idea Management System and 'Open Minds' is a collaboration space on the Web. Forrester Research, in its "Maximising Innovation from ERP Service Providers; Insights from Nasscom 2010" report, noted that: "Companies like UST allow their employees to spend part of their time in a research lab, developing user cases for new technologies."
UST won the ‘Most Innovative Emerging Corporation Award’ at the International Business Awards 2012 held in New Delhi.

The Kerala  state government on 6 November 2017 inked an MOU with UST along with Intel  for exploring the possibility of transforming the state into an electronic hardware manufacturing hub.

Acquisitions
UST invests and acquires companies.

 In January 2004, UST acquired  Inc.
 In March 2012, Andare, a mobile applications company, was acquired by UST. In January 2014, the company acquired Testhouse Consultores S.A., the Spanish arm of UK-based Testhouse Limited.
 In May 2014, UST acquired Kanchi Technologies, a Milwaukee-based engineering company, and Xpanxion, a technology firm. Xpanxion provides cloud-based business application development, mobile application development, software testing services, and technology and business consulting.
 In July 2014, UST invested in xTV, an online TV platform, and acquired Renaissance Solutions, a Singapore-based recruitment specialist. In April 2015, UST acquired FogPanel to boost cloud infrastructure management.
 In September 2017, UST invested in MyDoc, a Singapore-based digital healthcare firm, to drive population-wide digital health programs, including disease management and health data tracking.
 In January 2018, Cyberpoof, a cybersecurity company of UST, acquired Bisec, an Israeli startup that created a platform to help security teams collaborate. The following month, UST acquired American technology startup and Gartner Cool Vendor, Pneuron in an effort to improve its data analytics services. In September 2018, UST acquired SeviTech Systems, a chip design services firm based in Bengaluru.
 In October 2019, the company acquired SCM Accelerators to help grow its SAP business.
 In November 2019, UST acquired Contineo Health, a healthcare technology consulting firm that specializes in electronic health records (EHR), ComplyUSA, a compliance assessment and privacy automation platform, and AI startup, Cogniphi Technologies.
 In December 2019, Necsia Cybersecurity Division was acquired. The company is a security provider in Spain and the security division of Necsia Group, specializing in cybersecurity and digital transformation services. The company was merged into the CyberProof security services portfolio after the acquisition.
 In June 2020, UST invested €1.3 million in Ksubaka, a UK-based startup. The portfolio includes gamified tools to engage and keep customers safe post-covid. The following month, UST invested in Smart Software Testing Solutions, a software testing and product company, that utilizes SaaS platforms pCloudy and OpKey.
 In August 2020, UST invested in Tastry, an AI company that studies how human senses interpret product chemistry.
 In July 2022 , UST announced a strategic investment in Well-Beat, an Israeli start-up with a focus on patient-centred behavioural artificial intelligence (AI). 
 In October 2022, UST HealthProof, a UST company, has acquired Advantasure a Blue Cross Blue Shield - BCBS (M) arm from MI, USA.  The Advantasure is a new brand formed in 2019 under BCBSM comprising other periodic and strategic acquisitions like Visiant, IkaSystems, Tessellate among many others.  The Advantasure is a PaaS platform for both Healthcare and BPO clients.

Temasek 
 In June 2018, Temasek, Singapore’s sovereign wealth fund, invested $250 million in UST, giving UST a $1 billion-plus valuation.

Diversity 
UST has several programs to help build diversity and inclusion in the workplace. This includes “The Sheroes Hours'' and “Tech She Can”, celebrating women in the tech industry; the Network Of Women USsociates; “Curved Colors,” a group for the LGBTQAI+ community; UST Impact, which looks for talent within the differently-abled community in India; which looks for talent within the differently abled community; and “UST Step IT Up,” which is an accelerated training program to train women, minorities, and veterans in STEM fields. In 2014, Joe Biden, who was then Vice President, visited the Detroit center of "UST Step IT Up" and spoke at an event.

UST Campus

UST is based in Orange County, California and has offices in more than 25 countries. It is based in the following regions: the Americas, EMEA, APAC, and India.

UST has started its expansion plans in the capital city Thiruvananthapuram with the construction of an own campus, near Technopark. The campus will also feature a  waterbody channeling through the various blocks of the campus.

Subsidiaries

CyberProof
CyberProof is a fully owned subsidiary of UST and founded in 2017 in Tel Aviv, Israel.

The company is a security services company that helps organizations to intelligently manage incident detection and response.

In January 2018, UST acquired BISEC, a cybersecurity company, for 5.8 million Dollars and integrated the technology into CyberProof.

CyberProof is headquartered in Aliso Viejo, California, United States and has regional offices in London, United Kingdom; Trivandrum, India; Singapore and Barcelona, Spain. As of 2021, the company has approximately 500 employees worldwide.

Tony Velleca is the chief executive officer of CyberProof and is a chief information security officer at UST. Yuval Wollman is President of CyberProof and is responsible for the company’s Israel-based Development & Operations.

Awards & recognitions
 Cybersecurity Breakthrough Award, October 15, 2019, in Recognition of Outstanding Information Security Services.
 Cyber Defense Global Awards for Cutting Edge Managed Detection and Response.
 CyberProof wins 16th Annual Info Security PG’s 2020 Global Excellence Awards, February 2020.
 CyberProof wins InfoSec Awards, February 2020.
Top Case Study Award for Digital Excellence from Information Services Group (ISG) - recognized UST as a leader in digital excellence and gave recognition for UST’s role in one of the top 25 examples of digital transformation in 2020.
Business Culture Award 2020 for “Best International Initiative for Business Culture.” 
Recognized as “Champion of Inclusion” and one of the “100 Best Companies for Women in India 2020” by Working Mother and Avtar.
Krishna Sudheendra named as one of the “25 Highest Rated CEOs During the COVID-19 Crisis” in the U.S.
UST was certified as a “Great Place to Work” in the UK in 2020.
UST has been certified as a Top Employer by the Top Employers Institute (TEI) in India, USA, UK, Malaysia, Mexico, Spain, Singapore and Philippines for 2021.
UST received ISG’s 2020 Top Case Study Award for Digital Excellence.
Tastry, one of UST’s strategic investments, was named a ‘Cool Vendor’ by Gartner for using sensory science to improve the wine industry.
UST was ranked as one of Glassdoor’s Best 31 Tech Companies to Work For in 2020.
In 2020, UST was recognized as a top 'Disruptor' by Avasant in their RadarView market assessment which recognizes the Top-Tier providers enabling Digital Transformation in the Healthcare sector.
In Avasant's RadarView market assessment covering the Retail and CPG Digital Services space, UST was recognized as a top innovator in 2020-2021.
CyberProof Inc., a UST company, was recognized as a leader in a 2020 Forrester Research evaluation of MSSPs.
 In November 2021, CyberProof was recognized as a leader in the ISG Provider Lens 2021 Report (evaluation of top U.S. Managed Security Services Providers).
 In 2021, CyberProof was recognized for Technology Innovation Leadership by Frost & Sullivan and won the Cybersecurity Breakthrough Awards for the third year running.

Timeline
 1998 : Stephen Ross founded the company in Laguna Hills, California

Started Operations in Thiruvananthapuram, Kerala, India 
 1999 : Acquired Pinnacle Consulting.
Magnecomp International, a division of the Singapore Listed Magnecomp Corporation, acquires an interest in UST. 
G. A. Menon becomes the company's Non-Executive Chairman.
 2002  : Dan Gupta joined UST as its chief executive officer.
 2003 : Expanded operations with centers in Chicago and New York.
 2004 : Expanded operations with center in Malaysia.
 2005 : Acquired  Inc
Assessed at SEI CMMI Level 5 and PCMM Level 5.
Opened BPO operations in Chennai.
 2006 : Acquired Canada-based QA Labs Inc.
Initiated European operations with set up of UK office
Acquired  of land for exclusive campus in Thiruvananthapuram.
 2007 : Announced USD 130 million expansion plan.
Expanded operations with new centers in Kochi and Makati.
Entered the 2007 North American Offshore Applications Services Magic Quadrant.
Ranked among Best Green Outsourcers of 2007.
Profiled in Independent Research Firm Report on mid-tier Providers by Forrester Research, Inc.
 2009 : Established GenShare, a joint venture with GE.
Expanded operations with new delivery centre in Chile.
 2010 : Partnered Virgin Racing Formula One team for the 2010 season.
 2011  : UST Forms Innovation Lab Partnership with CCH.
 2012  : UST Acquires Andare.
UST partners with Kony, Vidyo, Apperian to build on its mobile strategy.
UST opens fourth US Domestic Sourcing Center Dallas Metro area, Texas.
UST starts operations in Mexico.
UST’s iDispatch earns the Vidyo Excellence Award for Customer Service
 2014 : Became the principal sponsor of the Chennai Super Kings for three years.
Acquired Kanchi Technologies Pvt Ltd.
2016 : UST inaugurates the first ever campus of their own in Thiruvananthapuram on 9 December 2016.
2019 May : Sajan Pillai retires and Krishna Sudheendra replaces him as chief executive officer.
2022 Oct : Acquired Advantasure a BCBSM arm from MI, USA, which is a new brand made merging Tessellate, Visiant, IkaSystems and others.

Controversy
In early 2008, California arbitrators ruled that US Technology Resources, LLC must pay Stephen J. Ross US $7.5 million for his founding interest in the company. The company had disputed the extent of Ross's actual contributions. The arbitration award was then confirmed by the Los Angeles Superior Court and judgment entered in Ross' favor.

References

Software companies based in California
Software companies of India
International information technology consulting firms
Outsourcing companies
Companies based in Aliso Viejo, California
Technology companies established in 1998
Companies based in Thiruvananthapuram
1998 establishments in California
Software companies of the United States